Neuropeptide FF receptor 2, also known as NPFF2 is a human protein encoded by the NPFFR2 gene.

See also
 Neuropeptide FF receptor

References

Further reading

External links

G protein-coupled receptors